The IET A F Harvey Engineering Research Prize is a global engineering research prize awarded annually to an innovative researcher by the Institution of Engineering and Technology. It was named after an engineer, Arthur Frank Harvey.
  
The award was made for the first time in 2011 and one award is made each year. Between 2011 and 2015 the prize money was £300,000. From 2016, the prize increased to £350,000.

The prize follows a three-year cycle, as follows:
 Year one: Medical engineering
 Year two: Microwaves and radar
 Year three: Lasers and optoelectronics

Conditions

The prize money is to be used for the furtherance of scientific research into the fields of medical, microwave, laser or radar engineering.

The IET A F Harvey Engineering Prize committee searches for potential candidates from around the world for the prize, drawing on wide international networks. The committee draws up a short-list of candidates from whom additional information is requested for further detailed consideration. 
The selection takes into account outstanding achievement and potential for further substantial advances in engineering and technology to the benefit of society.

List of recipients
Source: IET

See also

 List of engineering awards

References

British science and technology awards
Engineering awards
Institution of Engineering and Technology